Jelšava ( or Jelschau;) is a town and municipality in Revúca District in the Banská Bystrica Region of Slovakia.

Etymology
The name is derived from Slovak jelša (alder). Jelšava means "a place overgrown with alders" or "a forest with alders".

Geography
The town lies in the Revúcka vrchovina highlands at the border of the Slovak Ore Mountains and Slovak Karst, in the valley of the Muráň river, at an altitude of around 258 m.

Along to the main settlement, it also has "part" Teplá Voda, bit north-west of the town.

History
In historical records, the town was first mentioned in 1243 (1243 Illswa, 1271 Elswa, 1344 Ilsua, 1564 Jelssawa, 1573 Jolssowa, 1582 Ölch alias Ilschwa, 1594 Oltcz, 1592 Jelsowa, Josuach) as an important town and hammer, hosting German and Hungarian colonists. In the time it was ruled by Desiderius of the Ratoldy family, who was the founder of a new family, the Ilsvay (meaning "from Jelšava"). In 1556, Jelšava was besieged by Turks, to whom it had to pay tributes. In this period Protestantism arrived in the town. It was ruled by Ottoman Empire as part of Filek sanjak (Its centre was Rima Sonbot) during periods of 1554-1593 and 1596-1686. It was known as "Yoşva" during Ottoman period. In the 17th century, Jelšava passed to the Bocskay family. The first magnesite furnace in present-day Slovakia was built in 1894. After breakup of Austria-Hungary in 1918, the town passed to Czechoslovakia, which controlled the town lied until 1993, with exception of years 1938–1945, when it was occupied by Hungary (see First Vienna Award). In 1993, the town became a part of Slovakia.

Demographics
According to the 2001 census, the town had 3,287 inhabitants. 84.39% of inhabitants were Slovaks, 9.49% Roma, 2.46% Hungarians and 1.16% Czechs. The religious make-up was 40.77% Roman Catholics, 28.02% people with no religious affiliation and 16.28% Lutherans.

Twin towns — sister cities

Jelšava is twinned with:
 Uničov, Czech Republic 
 Tótkomlós, Hungary
 Nădlac, Romania
 Szczekociny, Poland

Famous people
 Ludwig Greiner, forester

See also
 List of municipalities and towns in Slovakia

References

Genealogical resources

The records for genealogical research are available at the state archive "Statny Archiv in Banska Bystrica, Kosice, Slovakia"

 Roman Catholic Church records (births/marriages/deaths): 1674-1895 (parish A)
 Greek Catholic Church records (births/marriages/deaths): 1775-1928 (parish B)
 Lutheran Church records (births/marriages/deaths): 1783-1895 (parish A)

External links
Official website 
Surnames of living people in Jelsava

Villages and municipalities in Revúca District
Cities and towns in Slovakia